Screven may refer to:

 Screven, Georgia
 Screven County, Georgia
 USS Screven (AK-210), an Alamosa-class cargo ship of the United States Navy

People with the surname
 William Screven (c. 1629 – 1713), English-born American Baptist minister and preacher